This article details the qualifying phase for badminton at the 2024 Summer Olympics.  The competition will comprise a total of 172 badminton players, with an equal distribution between men and women, coming from the different NOCs, similar to those in the previous editions. The qualification period commences on May 1, 2023, and will conclude on April 28, 2024, with the final eligibility list published two days after the deadline.

NOCs may enter a maximum of two players each in the men's and women's singles if they are ranked within the top sixteen of the "Race to Paris" ranking list, respectively; otherwise, they will send a single player until the roster of thirty-eight is complete. Similar protocols also apply to the players competing in the doubles tournament as the NOCs could enter a maximum of two pairs if they are ranked in the top eight with the rest entitled to a single pair until the quota of sixteen is reached.

Standards 
The remaining badminton players must undergo a direct qualifying process to secure a spot in their respective categories for Paris 2024 through the "Race to Paris" ranking list prepared by the Badminton World Federation. The qualification period commences on May 1, 2023, and will conclude on April 28, 2024, with the final eligibility list published two days after the deadline (April 30, 2024). The qualification pathway for Paris 2024 will produce a total of sixteen pairs each in the doubles tournaments (men's, women's, and mixed) and an initial distribution of thirty-eight (38) players in the singles based on the following criteria:

Singles:
Ranking 1-16: Players will alternate. NOCs may enter a maximum of two players if they are placed within the top sixteen of the BWF World Rankings.
Ranking 17 and below: Players will alternate. NOCs may enter a maximum of a single player.
Doubles:
Rankings 1–8: Pairs will alternate. NOCs may enter a maximum of two pairs if they are placed within the top eight of the BWF World Rankings.
Rankings 9 and below: Pairs will alternate. NOCs may enter a maximum of a single player.

Each of the five continental zones must enter at least one player in the singles tournament and a pair in the doubles under the rules and regulations of the BWF Continental Representation Place system. If unsatisfied by the entry selection method described above, the highest-ranked eligible player or pair from the respective continental zone will qualify for Paris 2024. NOCs can enter badminton players or pairs in a maximum of two events through the BWF Continental Representation Place system; if the NOC qualifies for more than two events through the system, the NOC must select which of them is qualified, and the quota place declined transfers to the next highest-ranked eligible player or pair.

Host nation France reserves a spot each in the men's and women's singles to be officially awarded to its respective highest-ranked badminton player based on the BWF "Race to Paris" ranking list. If one or more French badminton players qualify directly, their slots will be reallocated to the next highest-ranked eligible player from the official "Race to Paris" list. Meanwhile, four places (two per gender) are entitled to the eligible NOCs interested to have badminton players compete for Paris 2024 under the Universality principle. These places are included in the BWF Continental Representation Place system.

If any badminton player qualifies for both the singles and the doubles events, an unused spot will be awarded to the next highest-ranked eligible player of a respective gender in the singles tournament based on the official "Race to Paris" list. These protocols must ascertain a fair distribution between men and women qualifying for their respective events at the Games with the singles tournaments expanding from 38 to accommodate additional players.

Summary

Singles 
Legend

Men's singles

Women's singles

Doubles 
Legend

Men's doubles

Women's doubles

Mixed doubles

References

Qualification for the 2024 Summer Olympics
Qualification